Walter Wagner (born 26 July 1949) is a German former professional footballer who played as a striker. His nickname was "Wawa".

Career
Wagner played for Eintracht Frankfurt between 1969 and 1971. In the 1971 he played for one season in SSV Reutlingen, a 2nd division team. Afterwards, he played in Austria Wien for 2 seasons. 

In the summer of 1974Wagner moved to Greece and played for AEK Athens. On 12 December 1976 he scored a hat-trick on a 4–1 against Ethnikos Piraeus He was a member of the squad that made it to the semi-finals of the UEFA Cup, scoring in total on both legs against Derby County for the second round. He also scored the winner in the match against Olympiacos on 13 March 1977. In the summer of 1977, although there was the intention to stay as long as he acquired Greek citizenship, his contract was ultimately not renewed.

He then signed at Aris for a season and in 1978 he played for Panathinaikos without a particular success.

Wagner moved in the USA and the Los Angeles Aztecs and in 1979 he returned to Germany where he played for SV Röchling Völklingen, but he soon returned to Greece to play for Panachaiki. He left after one year and ended his career with German club SG Wattenscheid 09.

References

External links
Profile at Eintracht Frankfurt Archive
NASL statistics

1949 births
Living people
German footballers
Association football forwards
Bundesliga players
Super League Greece players
North American Soccer League (1968–1984) players
Eintracht Frankfurt players
SSV Reutlingen 05 players
FK Austria Wien players
AEK Athens F.C. players
Aris Thessaloniki F.C. players
Panathinaikos F.C. players
Los Angeles Aztecs players
SV Röchling Völklingen players
Panachaiki F.C. players
SG Wattenscheid 09 players
German expatriate footballers
German expatriate sportspeople in Greece
Expatriate footballers in Greece
German expatriate sportspeople in the United States
Expatriate soccer players in the United States